Aḥmad al-Badawī, also known as Al-Sayyid al-Badawī, or as al-Badawī for short, or reverentially as Shaykh al-Badawī by all those Sunni Muslims who venerate saints, was a 13th-century Arab Sufi Muslim mystic who became famous as the founder of the Badawiyyah order of Sufism. Born in Fes, Morocco to a Bedouin tribe originally from the Syrian Desert, al-Badawi eventually settled for good in Tanta, Egypt in 1236, whence he developed a posthumous reputation as "One of the greatest saints in the Arab world" As al-Badawi is perhaps "the most popular of Muslim saints in Egypt", his tomb has remained a "major site of visitation" for Muslims in the region.

History
According to several medieval chronicles, al-Badawi hailed from an Arab tribe of Syrian origin. A Sunni Muslim by persuasion, al-Badawi entered the Rifa'iyya spiritual order (founded by the renowned Shafi'i mystic and jurist Ahmad al-Rifa'i [d. 1182]) in his early life, being initiated into the order at the hands of a particular Iraqi teacher. After a trip to Mecca, al-Badawi is said to have travelled to Iraq, "where his sainthood [is believed to have] clearly manifested itself" through the miracles he is said to have performed. Eventually, al-Badawi went to Tanta, Egypt, where settled for good in 1236. According to the various traditional biographies of the saint's life, al-Badawi gathered forty disciples around him during this period, who are collectively said to have "dwelt on the city's rooftop terraces," whence his spiritual order were informally named the "roof men" (aṣḥāb al-saṭḥ) in the vernacular. Al-Badawi died in Tanta in 1276, being seventy-six years old.

Spiritual lineage
As with every other major Sufi order, the Badawiyya proposes an unbroken spiritual chain of transmitted knowledge going back to the Prophet Muhammad through one of his Companions, which in the Badawiyya's case is Ali (d. 661).
In this regard, Idries Shah quotes al-Badawi: "Sufi schools are like waves which break upon rocks: [they are] from the same sea, in different forms, for the same purpose.".

See also
 Ibrahim El-Desouki, a contemporary Sufi.
 List of Sufis

References

Further reading
 Al-Imām Nūruddīn Al-Halabī Al-Ahmadī, Sīrah Al-Sayyid Ahmad Al-Badawī, Published by Al-Maktabah Al-Azhariyyah Li Al-Turāth, Cairo.
 Mayeur-Jaouen, Catherine, Al-Sayyid Ahmad Al-Badawi: Un Grand Saint De L'islam egyptien, Published by Institut francais d'archeologie orientale du Caire

External links
 Pilgrimage/Carnival photos by BBC
  A short Egyptian documentary on the Mawlid of Al-Sayyid Ahmad al-Badawi
 A short biography 
 Egypt: Handbook for Travellers : Part First, Lower Egypt, with the Fayum and the Peninsula of Sinai by Karl Baedeker (1885)

Shafi'is
Sunni Sufis
Sunni Muslim scholars of Islam
Founders of Sufi orders
Moroccan Sufis
People from Fez, Morocco
Moroccan emigrants to Egypt
Moroccan people of Arab descent
Sunni Muslims
Moroccan religious leaders
Muslim saints
13th-century jurists
13th-century Arabs
13th-century Moroccan people
1200 births
1276 deaths
Bedouins